Altorf is an unincorporated community in Kankakee County, in the U.S. state of Illinois.

History
Altorf was laid out in 1858, taking its name after Altdorf, in Switzerland. A post office was established at Altorf in 1886, and remained in operation until 1887.

References

Unincorporated communities in Kankakee County, Illinois
Unincorporated communities in Illinois